Beautiful Road is singer Kate Taylor's fourth album, released in 2003.

After Taylor's previous album, 1979's It's in There failed to reach its public, Taylor took a break from the music industry for the next two decades, during which time she appeared sporadically as a performer and back-up singer for various other artists, not releasing another album until Beautiful Road in 2003.

The album contained new material, and not the primarily covers of her previous work. Most of the songs were written by Taylor's husband and manager, Charlie Witham. Unfortunately, Witham fell ill while the album was being recorded and would die shortly before it was released in April 2003.

The album closes with a version "Auld Lang Syne", arranged by Taylor's brother James. Taylor covered the song himself the following year as the last song on James Taylor: A Christmas Album (2004).

Track listing
All tracks composed by Charlie Witham; except where indicated

 "I Will Fly" – 5:28 
 "Beautiful Road" (Erica Wheeler) – 3:53 
 "Blue Tin Suitcase" – 4:23 
 "The Golden Key" – 6:19 
 "Rain on the Water" – 4:58 
 "Flying in the Face of Mr. Blue" (Randall Bramblett, Davis Causey, Bucky Jones) – 5:26 
 "Shanty Song" – 4:05 
 "He's Waiting" (Kate Taylor) – 2:42 
 "Shores of Paradise" – 5:18 
 "Auld Lang Syne" (Robert Burns; Traditional) – 3:08

Personnel
 Kate Taylor – vocals
 Kevin Barry – acoustic guitar 
 Richard Bell – piano
 Peter Calo – acoustic guitar
 Larry Campbell – electric guitar 
 Clifford Carter – synthesizer 
 Shannon Ford – percussion, drums 
 Tony Garnier – bass, tambourine
 Vance Gilbert – acoustic guitar 
 Tom Hambridge – drums, tambourine 
 Levon Helm – mandolin 
 Mindy Jostyn – guitar, violin
 Stuart Kimball – acoustic guitar
 Chuck Leavell – organ, piano 
 Dennis McDermott – drums 
 Arlen Roth – acoustic guitar, electric guitar, Fender telecaster 
 Mavis Staples – vocals
 James Taylor – vocals

2003 albums
Kate Taylor albums
CBS Records albums